LJ Ross (the pen name of Louise Ross) is the bestselling author of the DCI Ryan series of romantic suspense thrillers. Her debut novel, Holy Island, was released in January 2015 and, by May, it had reached number one in the Amazon UK chart. Its sequel, Sycamore Gap, released in September 2015, is also a UK bestseller. She has released further books in the DCI Ryan series, amassing a further nine UK #1s, and she is reported to have sold over 7,000,000 copies.

Early life
Ross was born and grew up in Northumberland. She completed undergraduate and postgraduate degrees in Law at King's College London, where she met her husband, and she continued her studies in Paris and Florence. After spending most of her twenties working in the City as a lawyer, she began to feel it was time for change.

Publishing career

After the birth of her son, Ross wrote the first draft of Holy Island, having been inspired by the atmospheric beauty of Lindisfarne, a place she knew well from childhood. Following its success, she now writes full-time. The second book in her series of DCI Ryan novels, Sycamore Gap, is set in Hadrian's Wall country and subsequent DCI Ryan novels continue the Northumbrian locations, with stories set in Northumberland, County Durham and Newcastle.

The eighteenth instalment of the DCI Ryan series, The Rock, was the UK's third best-selling eBook of 2021, behind novels by Richard Osman and Matt Haig.

In 2021, Ross published The Cove, the first book in a new series, Summer Suspense Mysteries.

Ross publishes all of her works independently through Dark Skies Publishing, a publishing imprint set up and managed by Ross and her husband.

Personal life
Ross lives with her husband and two children in Northumberland.

Philanthropy
In 2021, Ross set up the Northern Photography Prize for images captured in the North East of England, as well as reading and writing challenges and prizes for adults and children.

Novels

DCI Ryan Mysteries Series 
Police procedural mystery/romantic suspense series set in Northumbria, England following Detective Chief Inspector Ryan.

Alexander Gregory Thrillers Series 
Forensic psychologist Doctor Alexander Gregory becomes involved in murder investigations.

The Summer Suspense Mysteries Series 
A suspense series set in rural Cornwall.

References

External links
Official website

Year of birth missing (living people)
Living people
Alumni of King's College London
Writers from Newcastle upon Tyne
English women novelists
English thriller writers
English crime fiction writers
Women thriller writers
21st-century pseudonymous writers
Pseudonymous women writers